Ethmia ermineella is a moth in the family Depressariidae. It was described by Walsingham in 1880. It is found in Tibet, Nepal (Tampa Khosi Tal), northern India (Punjab), Burma, northern Vietnam and western China (Yunnan, Sichuan).

The forewings are grey-whitish with thirteen roundish or elongate black spots: one small near the base in the middle, two oblique from the costa at the base and one-sixth, one on the fold at one-fourth and the others forming three angulated transverse series of three spots each, the middle one of the second series most elongate. There are eleven large black marginal dots around the posterior part of the costa and termen. The hindwings are light grey, tinged with whitish anteriorly.

References

Moths described in 1880
ermineella